Lower Hartshay is a small village in the Amber Valley District, in the English county of Derbyshire. It is on Hartshay Brook and near the A38 road. The nearest town is Ripley. There is the corresponding hamlet of Upper Hartshay just to the south.

References 
 http://wikimapia.org/9929891/Lower-Hartshay

Hamlets in Derbyshire
Geography of Amber Valley